Tikka Sankarayya is a 1968 Indian Telugu-language comedy film directed by D. Yoganand and produced by D. V. S. Raju. It stars N. T. Rama Rao, Krishna Kumari and Jayalalithaa, with music composed by T. V. Raju.

Plot 
Raghavayya, a middle-class villager, lives with his overbearing wife Kantamma, and his two daughters Suseela and Rani. Suseela is mistreated by Kantamma for being her stepdaughter. Meanwhile, a young and charismatic man named Mohan visits to set up a marriage with Rani but instead falls in love with Suseela. However, Lingaraju, a loan shark, also wants to marry Suseela. He asks Raghavayya to get him and Suseela married to absolve him of his debt. Overhearing the conversation, Mohan decides to pay back the debt, so he immediately seeks out his father Kodandaramayya who refuses to give his son money. Mohan decides to leave the house, but his mother aids him by selling her jewelry. Kanthamma forces Suseela to marry Lingaraju, but Suseela escapes before the marriage can take place. Kanthamma falsifies the marriage, marrying Lingaraju to their maid instead. Mohan witnesses the wedding, believing that Suseela and Lingjaru got married. Suseela and Mohan encounter each other on the same train to the city. Mohan rejects Suseela's advances, still thinking she is married. Soon after, Mohan gets into an accident and ends up in the hospital. Suseela meets him in the hospital, where Mohan rejects her a final time. Mohan accidentally leaves his briefcase full of money behind, and Suseela brings it back to his father. He appreciates Suseela's honesty, accepting her as his daughter-in-law as they wait for Mohan's arrival. 

During an argument with Kantamma, Lingjaru finds out that he married a maid instead of Suseela. Kantamma promises that she will find Suseela and perform the marriage once and for all. Kantamma sends her brother Devayya to search for Suseela, and he runs into Mohan. Devayya explains the situation to Mohan, and both go searching for Suseela. Sankaram, a madman who resembles Mohan, flees from a mental hospital. The staff of the mental hospital confuse Mohan with Sankaram, and brings Mohan to the mental hospital. Devayya, believing Sankaram to be Mohan, brings him back to their village. Eventually, Sankaram and Rani fall in love. Sankaram's father visits Mohan in the hospital, but realizes Mohan is not his son and he is released. Before Mohan returns, Suseela gets a letter from Kantamma saying that Mohan is ready to marry Rani. Distressed, Suseela leaves the house. Upon his return, Mohan reads the letter and begins to search for Suseela to resolve the misunderstanding. Once reaching the village, Suseela tries to convince Sankaram to marry her, still believing him to be Mohan. An angered Lingjaru backstabs Sankaram and kidnaps Suseela. After regaining consciousness, Sankaram regains his memory and reveals he is not Mohan. Just as he is about to leave, Rani stops him and proclaims her love for him. Mohan then rescues Suseela from Lingjaru and at last, Lingaraju accepts the maid as his wife. The movie ends with Mohan marrying Suseela and Sankaram marrying Rani.

Cast 
 N. T. Rama Rao as Mohan and Sankaram (dual role)
 Krishna Kumari as Suseela
 Jayalalithaa as Rani
 V. Nagayya as Raghavayya
 Nagabhushanam as Lingaraju
 Rajanala as Sodabuddi Sambayya
 Relangi as Madman
 Allu Ramalingayya as Sidhanthi
 Padmanabham as Devayya
 Raja Babu as Madman
 Suryakantam as Kanthamma
 Hemalatha as Mohan's mother
 Dr. Sivaramakrishnayya as Kodandaramayya
 Raavi Kondala Rao as Madman
 Balakrishna as Appanna
 Mukku Raju as Dance Teacher

Music 
Music was composed by T. V. Raju. Lyrics were written by C. Narayana Reddy.

References

External links 
 

1960s Telugu-language films
1968 comedy films
Films directed by D. Yoganand
1968 films
Films scored by T. V. Raju
Indian comedy films